Diamant 13 is a 2009 French-Belgian-Luxembourgian film noir co-written and directed by Gilles Béhat. The screenplay is based on Hugues Pagan's novel L'Étage des Morts. The film was nominated for a Magritte Award in the category of Best Original Score for Frédéric Vercheval in 2011.

Synopsis 
Mat is  an aging,  worn police officer. One day he is present when a criminal takes a female hostage in order to use the woman as a human shield. Mat refutes this strategy by shooting the man dead. The hostage remains unharmed but Mat knows all too well his action could have gone awry very easily. So afterwards he throws up and indulges himself to binge drinking. His constant enervation and his alcoholism have rendered him unacceptable as a law enforcer. When he is about to get sacked a former buddy contacts him. Franck has switched sides a long time ago and feels Mat would now be ready to condone this. But in spite of his misery Mat hesitates to become a drug trafficker. As fickle as he is it can work out either way.

Cast 
 Gérard Depardieu as Mat
 Olivier Marchal as Franck Novak
 Asia Argento as Calhoune
 Anne Coesens as Léon
 Aïssa Maïga as Farida
 Catherine Marchal as Z'yeux d'or (Golden Eyes)
 Aurélien Recoing as Ladje
 Erick Deshors as Spoke
 Marc Zinga as Ali Baba Mike

References

External links
 
 
 

2009 films
2000s French-language films
2000s crime films
French crime films
Films based on crime novels
Films based on French novels
Films shot in Bruges
French neo-noir films
Police detective films
Films directed by Gilles Béhat
2000s French films